The Campus Queen is a 2004 Nollywood musical that was directed by Tunde Kelani with production from Mainframe Films and Television Productions. The film premiered at the 2004 edition of the African Film Festival in New York City, U.S.A. It was also the official film selection at the Black Film Festival in Cameroon.

Background
The Campus Queen is a film accompanied by much music, dance and activism, thus depicting the lifestyle of students in university campuses. It also highlights the urge for power and supremacy by student clubs.

Cast
Jide Kosoko
Lere Paimo
Segun Adefila
Sound Sultan
Khabirat Kafidipe
Tope Idowu
Afeez Oyetoro
Serah Mbaka
Akinwunmi Isola

References

External links
 

2004 films
Nigerian musical drama films
Films directed by Tunde Kelani
Yoruba-language films
English-language Nigerian films